Senator Varney may refer to:

Edmund Varney (1778–1847), New York State Senate
George D. Varney Sr. (1903–1982), Maine State Senate

See also
Senator Barney (disambiguation)